To Die For is a 1995 satirical black comedy film directed by Gus Van Sant, and written by Buck Henry based on the novel of the same name by Joyce Maynard, which in turn was inspired by the story of Pamela Smart. It stars Nicole Kidman, Joaquin Phoenix, and Matt Dillon, with Illeana Douglas, Wayne Knight, Casey Affleck, Kurtwood Smith, Dan Hedaya, and Alison Folland as supporting cast. Kidman was nominated for a BAFTA, and won a Golden Globe Award and a Best Actress Award at the 1st Empire Awards for her performance. Her character has been described as suffering from narcissistic personality disorder in the scientific journal BMC Psychiatry.

The film includes cameos by George Segal, David Cronenberg, author Maynard, and screenwriter Henry. It features original music by Danny Elfman.

Plot
In the fictional town of Little Hope, New Hampshire, Suzanne Stone is a glamorous and ambitious young woman who has always been obsessed with being on television, aspiring to become a world-famous broadcast journalist. She begins a passionate romance with Larry Maretto, an Italian American, whom her parents disapprove of, and the two quickly marry. Despite the differences between their families, the two seemingly settle into married life happily, and Larry promises to support her career ambitions. She uses his family restaurant business to keep herself financially stable and takes a job as an assistant at WWEN, a local cable station, in hopes of climbing the network ladder. Through relentless persistence, she is eventually promoted to doing the station's evening weather report.

Suzanne goes to a local high school to recruit subjects for a documentary she is producing, “Teens Speak Out,” that focuses on various issues teenagers are facing. She immediately attracts two delinquents, Jimmy Emmett and Russel Hines, and befriends Lydia Mertz, a shy and insecure girl who admires Suzanne’s glamor and worldliness. Larry begins pressuring Suzanne to give up her career in favor of helping out at the restaurant and starting a family with him. As he becomes more persistent, Suzanne views him as an impediment to her desired future and immediately begins plotting his murder. She seduces Jimmy and convinces him to murder Larry by falsely claiming abuse and promising they will have a future together in California once Larry is dead. She also manipulates Lydia into procuring a gun. One night while Suzanne delivers the evening weather report,  Jimmy and Russell break into the Maretto’s condo, and Jimmy shoots  Larry to death.

Though Larry's death is ruled the result of a botched burglary, the police stumble across a Teens Speak Out clip of Suzanne at their school, which points to her sexual involvement with Jimmy. The teens are arrested and connected to the crime scene. Lydia makes a deal with the police to converse with Suzanne while wearing a wire, and Suzanne unwittingly reveals her hand in the murder. However, despite this damning evidence, Suzanne argues that the police resorted to entrapment and is released on bail. All the charges against Suzanne are dropped.

Basking in the media spotlight, however, Suzanne fabricates a story about Larry being a cocaine addict who was murdered by Jimmy and Russell, his purported dealers. Jimmy and Russell are sentenced to life in prison. Russell gets his sentence reduced while Lydia is released on probation. Meanwhile, Larry's father, Joe, realizes Suzanne was behind his son's death and uses his mafia connections to have her murdered. A hitman lures Suzanne away from her home by posing as a movie studio executive, kills her, and conceals her body beneath a frozen lake.

Lydia tells her side of the story in a televised interview and gains national attention, becoming a celebrity. Janice, Larry's sister who always hated Suzanne, practices her figure skating on the frozen lake where Suzanne's corpse lies.

Cast

Production
To Die For is a mixture of styles, combining a traditional drama with darkly comic direct-to-camera monologues by Kidman's character, and mockumentary interviews, some tragic, with certain of the other characters in the film.

The film and the novel it is based on were both inspired by the facts that emerged during the trial of Pamela Smart, a school media services coordinator who was imprisoned for seducing a 16-year-old student and convincing him to kill her husband.

The role of Suzanne Stone was originally offered to Meg Ryan, who turned down the part and the $5 million salary offered. Kidman, who was later cast in the role, was paid $2 million.

Reception

Critical reception
The film was screened out of competition at the 1995 Cannes Film Festival. To Die For was very well received by critics, with Nicole Kidman's performance being especially praised. The film holds an 88% "certified fresh" rating on Rotten Tomatoes based on 60 reviews, where the consensus reads "Smart, funny, and thoroughly well-cast, To Die For takes a sharp – and sadly prescient – stab at dissecting America's obsession with celebrity." On Metacritic, it has a weighted average score of 86 out of 100 based on reviews from 23 critics, indicating "universal acclaim".

Katherine Ramsland of Crime Library describes the film as an example of a work displaying women with antisocial personalities; Ramsland describes Suzanne as a "manipulator extraordinaire" who harms people through third parties.

In her review in The New York Times, Janet Maslin called the film "an irresistible black comedy and a wicked delight" and added, "[it] takes aim at tabloid ethics and hits a solid bull's-eye, with Ms. Kidman's teasingly beautiful Suzanne as the most alluring of media-mad monsters. The target is broad, but Gus Van Sant's film is too expertly sharp and funny for that to matter; instead, it shows off this director's slyness better than any of his work since Drugstore Cowboy ... Both Mr. Van Sant and Ms. Kidman have reinvented themselves miraculously for this occasion, which brings out the best in all concerned."

Mick LaSalle of the San Francisco Chronicle said of Kidman, "[she] brings to the role layers of meaning, intention and impulse. Telling her story in close-up – as she does throughout the film – Kidman lets you see the calculation, the wheels turning, the transparent efforts to charm that succeed in charming all the same ... her beauty and magnetism are electric. Undeniably she belongs on camera, which means it's equally undeniable that Suzanne belongs on camera. That in itself is an irony, a commentary or both."

Writing in 2007, Emanuel Levy stated, "mean-spirited satire, told in mock-tabloid style, this film features the best performance of Nicole Kidman to date (better than The Hours for which she won an Oscar), as an amoral small-town girl obsessed with becoming a TV star."

American Film Institute recognition:
 AFI's 100 Years...100 Heroes and Villains:
 Suzanne Stone – Nominated Villain
 AFI's 100 Years...100 Laughs – Nominated

Box office
The film grossed $21 million in the United States and Canada and $41 million worldwide.

References

External links
 
 
 
 
 
 

1995 films
American drama films
British drama films
Canadian drama films
Columbia Pictures films
1990s English-language films
Films about television people
Films based on American novels
American films based on actual events
British films based on actual events
Canadian films based on actual events
Films directed by Gus Van Sant
Films featuring a Best Musical or Comedy Actress Golden Globe winning performance
Films scored by Danny Elfman
Films set in New Hampshire
Films shot in Florida
Films shot in Toronto
Films with screenplays by Buck Henry
Cultural depictions of weather presenters
American black comedy films
American satirical films
Mariticide in fiction
1990s American films
1990s Canadian films
1990s British films